Douglas Gordon James (1922-2000)  was the Archdeacon of Margam from 1988  to 1992.

James was educated at University College of Wales, Aberystwyth and became a solicitor. He studied for the priesthood at Queen's College, Edgbaston and was ordained in 1976. After a curacy he  was the incumbent at Aberdare until his appointment as Archdeacon.

References

1922 births
2000 deaths
Alumni of Aberystwyth University
Alumni of the Queen's Foundation
Archdeacons of Margam
Welsh solicitors
20th-century British lawyers